The Bahariya Formation (also transcribed as Baharija Formation) is a fossiliferous geologic formation dating back to the early Cenomanian, which outcrops within the Bahariya depression in Egypt, and is known from oil exploration drilling across much of the Western Desert where it forms an important oil reservoir.

Extent 
 
The Bahariya Formation forms the base of the depression, the lower part of the enclosing escarpment  and all of the small hills within. The type section for the formation is found at Gebel El-Dist, a hill at the northern end of the Bahariya depression.

Stratigraphy and sedimentology 
Four depositional sequences have been recognised in the Bahariya Formation in the Bahariya depression, separated by three sub-aerial unconformities. The formation was deposited during a period of relative rise in sea level, with each unconformity representing a relative fall in sea level. Each of the individual sequences contains sediments deposited under fluvial, shoreline and shallow marine conditions.

Flora 
Thirty different genera are known from Bahariya, including megaflora. Much of the material is yet to be described.

Other taxa include Sapindales, Piperaceae, Lauraceae, Platanaceae, Magnoliopsida, Nymphaeaceae, Cornaceae, Proteaceae and Vitaceae not identified at genus level; and miospore and pollen species.

Microfauna and Meiofauna

Foraminifera

Other microorganisms

Invertebrates

Molluscs

Crustaceans (Ostracoda)

Insects 
Direct fossils are sparse, though plant leaves with extensive damage from folivorous insects have been documented.

Vertebrates

Cartilaginous fish

Bony fish

Testudines

Squamates

Plesiosaurs

Crocodyliformes

Pterosaurs

Sauropods

Theropods 

In addition, there are isolated theropod teeth disputedly assigned to dromaeosaurids, or to abelisaurids.

See also 
 List of dinosaur-bearing rock formations

References 

 
Geologic formations of Egypt
Upper Cretaceous Series of Africa
Sandstone formations
Mudstone formations
Siltstone formations
Fluvial deposits
Shallow marine deposits
Paleontology in Egypt